Oxygène: New Master Recording is a new recording by Jean-Michel Jarre of his 1976 album Oxygène.  It was released in 2007, marking the 30th anniversary of the original worldwide release. It is his first release on EMI and his next releases were on Capitol Records.

Background 
The album was recorded live, without tape or hard disk playback, with help from Francis Rimbert, Claude Samard and Dominique Perrier. The album also contains three extra tracks ("Variation Part 1", "2" and "3", respectively) not found on either the original or remake, which form links between the main movements. The artwork featured a 3D model by Giovanni Bourgeois based in the original Michel Granger design used for Oxygène album cover.

Release 
In November 26, 2007, Oxygène: New Master Recording was released on EMI label in different editions which included a CD with 5.1 Surround sound recording and animated visual, a 2D DVD featuring a live performance recorded in Lint, Belgium called Oxygène — Live in Your Living Room, and a 3D DVD featuring the live performance in stereoscopic 3D High-Definition, which also includes two pairs of 3D glasses. To promote this album Jarre performed 10 concerts (Oxygène Live) in Paris, from 12 to 26 December 2007, held in the Théâtre Marigny, a small 1000-seat theatre in the Champs-Élysées. Later in 2008 Jarre performed several concerts to celebrate the 30th anniversary of Oxygène, in theaters in Europe. He also played the album at the Royal Albert Hall, London.

That same year Disques Dreyfus re-released The Complete Oxygène, containing the original versions of Oxygène and Oxygène 7–13, and remixes of the latter. In 2008, The Mail on Sunday newspaper distributed more than 2 million copies of the Oxygène: New Master Recording CD to its readers in the United Kingdom. In the same year, Francis Dreyfus Music said it intended to bring legal action against The Mail on Sunday and EMI, based on the claim that the contents of the CD did not come from the new re-recorded master, but from the original master of which the French label owned the rights.

Track listing

New Master Recording CD 
 "Oxygène Part 1" – 7:39
 "Oxygène Part 2" – 7:54
 "Oxygène Part 3" – 3:06
 "Oxygène Part 4" – 4:13
 "Oxygène Part 5" – 10:11
 "Oxygène Part 6" – 7:05

Live in Your Living Room 2D DVD 
Special edition only
 "Prelude" (new track)
 "Oxygène Part 1"
 "Oxygène Part 2"
 "Oxygène Part 3"
 "Variation Part 1" (new track)
 "Oxygène Part 4"
 "Variation Part 2" (new track)
 "Oxygène Part 5"
 "Variation Part 3" (new track)
 "Oxygène Part 6"

 + The Making Of
 + Instruments Presentation

Live in Your Living Room stereoscopic 3D DVD 
Limited edition only (plus two pairs of 3D glasses)
 "Prelude" (new track)
 "Oxygène Part 1"
 "Oxygène Part 2"
 "Oxygène Part 3"
 "Variation Part 1" (new track)
 "Oxygène Part 4"
 "Variation Part 2" (new track)
 "Oxygène Part 5"
 "Variation Part 3" (new track)
 "Oxygène Part 6"

 + The Making Of
 + Instruments Presentation
 + 3D gallery

Charts

References

External links 
 Oxygène: New Master Recording at Discogs

Jean-Michel Jarre albums
2007 albums